WKGO (88.1 FM) is a non-commercial radio station licensed to Murrysville, Pennsylvania, serving the Eastern suburbs of the Pittsburgh metropolitan area.  It carries an easy listening radio format.

WKGO is owned and operated by Broadcast Educational Communications, Inc., a not-for-profit 501(c)3 corporation. The studios and offices are on Lincoln Highway in North Versailles.  The transmitter is off Turkey Ridge Road in Murraysville.

As of December 19, 2019, WKGO is simulcast on KQV 1410 AM Pittsburgh.

References

External links

KGO
Radio stations established in 1994
1994 establishments in Pennsylvania
Easy listening radio stations